Ibiza (later retitled Ibiza: Love Drunk) is a 2018 American romantic comedy film directed by Alex Richanbach and written by Lauryn Kahn. Its story follows Harper, a 30-year-old woman from New York who travels to Barcelona on a business trip, which leads to a flirty encounter with a famous DJ. It stars Gillian Jacobs, Vanessa Bayer, Phoebe Robinson, Michaela Watkins, Jordi Mollà, and Richard Madden.

The film was produced by Gary Sanchez Productions and Good Universe and was released on Netflix on May 25, 2018. It received mixed to positive reviews from critics.

Plot
Harper is weary of life in New York City working for a PR firm. It does not help that her disgruntled boss Sarah is constantly reciting nasty one-liners at her while failing to recognize her hard work. However, in a surprise move, Sarah informs Harper that she has to fly to Barcelona for the weekend in order to secure a new client, a major opportunity for her to finally show her worth.

When Harper informs her friends Nikki and Leah, they decide that they are coming along, whether she likes it or not. Diego, one of the clients in Barcelona, flirts with Nikki and invites them to a nightclub. There, Harper meets the attractive DJ, the superstar Leo West, with whom she has instant chemistry. 

A man at the club invites the three friends to his place for a party, implying that Leo will be there. Their host promises drugs and possibility of freeing sexual experiences, but they have to suddenly leave when Leah unknowingly fools around with a married man and his wife chases them out with a knife.

Before Harper and Leo get a chance to spend any time together, he has to travel to Ibiza for his next gig. Harper has receives many missed calls and messages from her boss, but she doesn't call back right away. The pressure prompts her impulsive decision to fly to Ibiza to meet Leo, despite her work responsibilities and egged on by her friends, to secure the man of her dreams. 

The three friends arrive in Ibiza, and get sidetracked several times. They are dropped off at a spot to watch the sunset then are stuck there for ages. The taxi who finally picks them up randomly brings them to his house, where they hang out for awhile, and later head out in his limo. 

Harper finally calls her boss, finding out that the time of her meeting with the client has changed to the morning. She tries to call Leo, but it goes to voicemail, but the message doesn't get sent. Simultaneously he leaves her a voicemail expressing his interest.

At the club, Harper finally reunites with Leo, and she talks him into ending his session early so they can then spend a romantic night together before her return to Barcelona. The next day, Harper wakes late, she and Leo separate after a rushed trip to the airport and she misses the flight. 

Meanwhile, Nikki and Leah plan to impersonate Harper to help her out with Diego's help. Despite securing the deal, Harper's boss discovers that she failed to uphold her responsibilities as she videocalls the meeting and sees Nikki sitting in for her. Back in NYC, Harper is then fired so decides to start her own PR firm, taking former clients Harper liaised with.

Later on, Harper receives a call from Leo, who invites her to meet him at a gig in Tokyo. She declines, instead requesting he visit her in New York. Leo agrees and they both confess their feelings for each other. When Harper informs her friends of Leo's call, they tell her that she should have visited Leo, which she disagrees with. That night while on the subway, Harper smiles to herself over her future meeting with him.

Cast
 Gillian Jacobs as Harper
 Vanessa Bayer as Nikki
 Phoebe Robinson as Leah
 Richard Madden as Leo West
 Michaela Watkins as Sarah
 Félix Gómez Hernández as Diego
 Jordi Mollà as Hernando
 Augustus Prew as Miles
 Anthony Welsh as Peter
 Humphrey Ker as James
 Miguel Ángel Silvestre as Manny

Production
In April 2014, Sony Pictures acquired a romantic comedy spec script written by Lauryn Kahn, with Alex Richanbach directing, under the working title I'm in Love with the DJ. Will Ferrell, Adam McKay, and Kevin Messick served as producers under their Gary Sanchez Productions banner. In June 2017, Gillian Jacobs, Vanessa Bayer and Phoebe Robinson joined the cast of the film, with Netflix producing and distributing instead of Sony. Nathan Kahane, Joe Drake, and Erin Westerman will serve as producers under their Good Universe banner. In August 2017, Richard Madden joined the cast of the film.

Filming
Principal photography began on September 5, 2017. The film was shot mostly in Croatia. Split and Zrće in Croatia doubled as Barcelona, while most Ibiza scenes were filmed in Krk, Croatia.

Reception
Ibiza received mixed to positive reviews from critics. The critical consensus reads: "Ibiza settles into an amiable comedic groove enlivened by its talented stars, even if the end result is fittingly somewhat narratively hazy." On Metacritic, Ibiza scored 56 out of 100, based on 11 critics, indicating "mixed or average reviews".

Controversy
The filmmakers sought cooperation with the local government of Ibiza, but the film was opposed by the Consell d'Eivissa, and the film was ultimately filmed in Croatia. Ibiza island authorities are reportedly preparing a lawsuit against Netflix for abusing the Ibiza brand and for allegedly depicting a stereotypical and unfavorable image of the island.

References

External links
 
 

2018 films
2018 romantic comedy films
2010s buddy comedy films
2010s female buddy films
American buddy comedy films
American female buddy films
American romantic comedy films
2010s English-language films
Films about DJs
Films produced by Will Ferrell
Films set in Barcelona
Films set in Ibiza
Films set in New York City
Films shot in Croatia
Gary Sanchez Productions films
English-language Netflix original films
2010s American films
2018 directorial debut films